Johnstown is an unincorporated community in Calvert County, Maryland, United States. The historic Preston-on-the-Patuxent house was listed on the National Register of Historic Places in 1974.

References

Unincorporated communities in Calvert County, Maryland
Unincorporated communities in Maryland
Maryland populated places on the Chesapeake Bay